Sydney Duncan Heckbert (February 9, 1873 – August 5, 1953) was a Canadian politician. He served in the Legislative Assembly of New Brunswick as member of the Conservative party representing Northumberland County from 1925 to 1930.

References

20th-century Canadian politicians
1868 births
1963 deaths
Progressive Conservative Party of New Brunswick MLAs